Murat Tahir (born 12 March 1964) is a Turkish former swimmer. He competed in two events at the 1988 Summer Olympics.

References

External links
 

1964 births
Living people
Turkish male swimmers
Olympic swimmers of Turkey
Swimmers at the 1988 Summer Olympics
Place of birth missing (living people)
20th-century Turkish people